Casa do Pessoal do Porto do Lobito may refer to:

 Casa do Pessoal do Porto do Lobito (basketball)
 Casa do Pessoal do Porto do Lobito (handball)